Uglydoll is a brand based upon a series of plush toys created by Sun-Min Kim. The idea was first conceived between husband-and-wife team David Horvath and Sun-Min Kim through their exchange of written letters. 

The Uglydoll line was launched on February 14, 2001, and was awarded the Specialty Toy of the Year award by the Toy Industry Association in 2006.

Origin

Uglydoll started with a letter Horvath wrote to Kim after she had to move away due to an expiring student visa. The letter had a cartoon of his character "Wage" at the bottom with the words, "Working hard to make our dreams come true so we can be together again soon" next to it. 

As a surprise gift, Kim sewed a doll of Wage and sent it to Horvath in the mail. Horvath showed Wage to his magazine publisher friend, Eric Nakamura, owner of the Giant Robot magazine and store, who thought Horvath was pitching him a product and immediately ordered a few more for his shop. Horvath wrote to Kim asking her to sew more while sending emails with stories about Wage, Babo, and Ice-Bat's first-ever adventure, soon to become Chilly Chilly Ice-Bat.

Over the years, numerous collaborative art shows and conventions have been held at Giant Robot, Los Angeles.

The Uglydolls were created in 2001 and included Babo, Cinko, Ice Bat, Jeero, OX, Target, Tray, Wage, Wedgehead, and many more doll characters.

In media

Film

In May 2011, it was announced that Illumination had acquired the rights to Uglydolls to make an animated feature film. Chris Meledandri was set to produce, with a screenplay from Larry Stuckey. The original creators, David Horvath and Sun-Min Kim, were set to executive produce. However, the project never came to fruition.

Four years later, in 2015, the American magazineVariety reported that an animated film based on Uglydolls would be the first family and animation project produced by STXfilms. The film was released on May 3, 2019.

The film features the voices of Kelly Clarkson as Moxy (whose appearance is from the original Ugly Doll named Gorgeous, with Moxy's appearance being completely different), Pitbull as Ugly Dog, and Nick Jonas as Lou. They all perform original songs for the film. Wanda Sykes, Gabriel Iglesias, Blake Shelton, Wang Leehom, Janelle Monáe, and Emma Roberts are also in the cast. Animation was done by Reel FX Creative Studios.

Television series
In May 2018, Hulu signed a deal with STX Entertainment to produce an animated television series, based on UglyDolls. Hulu will also gain VOD rights to the animated film. The series will consist of 26 episodes each season. However, due to the film being a critical and financial failure, the series was cancelled.

See also 
 Beanie Babies

References

External links
Official links
Official website

Fan links
JCWage's Collection Pics
Barry O'Neil's Adventures In Uglyworld Website

Products introduced in 2001
Stuffed toys
Toy franchises